James Meldrum "Shakey" Peters Sr. (October 2, 1922 – October 11, 2006) was a Canadian ice hockey player who played in the National Hockey League between 1945 and 1954. He won the Stanley Cup three times, with the Montreal Canadiens in 1946, and with the Detroit Red Wings in 1950 and 1954.

Playing career
Peters was born in Verdun, Quebec in 1922 and played with the Montreal Junior Canadiens of the QJHL in 1940–41. He then served with the Canadian Army during World War II. From 1945 to 1954, Peters played with the Montreal Canadiens, with whom he scored the overtime goal to win the Stanley Cup (other websites do not offer any confirmation to this fact, but during a Stanley Cup playoff game his name was shown on a list of players who have scored a Stanley Cup winning goal in OT.)  Boston Bruins, Detroit Red Wings and Chicago Black Hawks of the National Hockey League.

After he retired from hockey in 1956, Peters was a salesman in the Detroit area. He died in Marquette, Michigan in 2006. His son Jimmy Peters Jr. also played hockey for the Detroit Red Wings. His nephew Glen Currie played hockey for the Washington Capitals, as well as the Los Angeles Kings. During his three-year tenure with the Canadiens he wore the number 19.  In his 166 games with the Canadiens he scored 35 goals and 50 assists for 85 points, and added another 4 goals and 3 assists in 20 playoff games. He was traded to Boston with John Quilty for Joe Carveth.

Career statistics

Regular season and playoffs

References
The Montreal Canadiens: A Hockey Dynasty by Claude Mouton

External links 
 

1922 births
2006 deaths
Boston Bruins players
Canadian ice hockey right wingers
Canadian expatriates in the United States
Canadian military personnel of World War II
Chicago Blackhawks players
Detroit Red Wings players
Ice hockey people from Montreal
Montreal Canadiens players
Ontario Hockey Association Senior A League (1890–1979) players
People from Verdun, Quebec
Pittsburgh Hornets players
Portland Buckaroos players
Springfield Kings players
Stanley Cup champions